The 2014–15 OHL season was the 35th season of the Ontario Hockey League, in which twenty teams played 68 games each according to the regular season schedule, from September 24, 2014 to March 22, 2015. The Niagara IceDogs began play at their new arena, the Meridian Centre. The Ottawa 67's returned to TD Place Arena after a two-year hiatus due to a renovation. Brian Kilrea returned to coach the Ottawa 67's for one game on October 17, becoming the oldest coach in league history.

The Oshawa Generals won the J. Ross Robertson Cup for the 13th time in franchise history, as they defeated the Erie Otters in five games in the final round of the playoffs.  The Generals qualified for the 2015 Memorial Cup held at Colisée Pepsi in Quebec City. Oshawa defeated the Kelowna Rockets 2-1 in overtime in the final game, winning the Memorial Cup for the fifth time in franchise history.

Near the end of the regular season, the Plymouth Whalers were sold, and the franchise moved to Flint, Michigan becoming the Flint Firebirds. Also near the end of the regular season, the Belleville Bulls were sold and the franchise  moved to Hamilton, Ontario, becoming the Hamilton Bulldogs.

Regular season

Final standings
Note: DIV = Division; GP = Games played; W = Wins; L = Losses; OTL = Overtime losses; SL = Shootout losses; GF = Goals for; GA = Goals against; PTS = Points; x = clinched playoff berth; y = clinched division title; z = clinched conference title

Eastern conference

Western conference

Scoring leaders
Note: GP = Games played; G = Goals; A = Assists; Pts = Points; PIM = Penalty minutes

Leading goaltenders
Note: GP = Games played; Mins = Minutes played; W = Wins; L = Losses: OTL = Overtime losses; SL = Shootout losses; GA = Goals Allowed; SO = Shutouts; GAA = Goals against average

Playoffs

Conference quarterfinals

Eastern conference quarterfinals

(1) Oshawa Generals vs. (8) Peterborough Petes

(2) Barrie Colts vs. (7) Belleville Bulls

(3) North Bay Battalion vs. (6) Kingston Frontenacs

(4) Ottawa 67's vs. (5) Niagara IceDogs

Western Conference quarterfinals

(1) Sault Ste. Marie Greyhounds vs. (8) Saginaw Spirit

(2) Erie Otters vs. (7) Sarnia Sting

(3) London Knights vs. (6) Kitchener Rangers

(4) Guelph Storm vs. (5) Owen Sound Attack

Conference semifinals

Eastern conference semifinals

(1) Oshawa Generals vs. (5) Niagara IceDogs

(2) Barrie Colts vs. (3) North Bay Battalion

Western conference semifinals

(1) Sault Ste. Marie Greyhounds vs. (4) Guelph Storm

(2) Erie Otters vs. (3) London Knights

Conference finals

Eastern conference finals

(1) Oshawa Generals vs. (3) North Bay Battalion

Western conference finals

(1) Sault Ste. Marie Greyhounds vs. (2) Erie Otters

J. Ross Robertson Cup

(E1) Oshawa Generals vs. (W2) Erie Otters

J. Ross Robertson Cup Champions Roster

Playoff scoring leaders
Note: GP = Games played; G = Goals; A = Assists; Pts = Points; PIM = Penalty minutes

Playoff leading goaltenders

Note: GP = Games played; Mins = Minutes played; W = Wins; L = Losses: OTL = Overtime losses; SL = Shootout losses; GA = Goals Allowed; SO = Shutouts; GAA = Goals against average

Awards

All-Star teams
The OHL All-Star Teams were selected by the OHL's General Managers.

First team
Connor McDavid, Centre, Erie Otters
Max Domi, Left Wing, London Knights
Mitch Marner, Right Wing, London Knights
Tony DeAngelo, Defence, Sarnia & Sault Ste. Marie
Chris Bigras, Defence, Owen Sound Attack
Lucas Peressini, Goaltender, Kingston Frontenacs
Sheldon Keefe, Coach, Sault Ste. Marie Greyhounds

Second team
Dylan Strome, Centre, Erie Otters
Tyler Bertuzzi, Left Wing, Guelph Storm
Alex DeBrincat, Right Wing, Erie Otters
Darnell Nurse, Defence, Sault Ste. Marie Greyhounds
Rasmus Andersson, Defence, Barrie Colts
Ken Appleby, Goaltender, Oshawa Generals
Jeff Brown, Coach, Ottawa 67's

Third team
Joseph Blandisi, Centre, Barrie Colts
Michael Dal Colle, Left Wing, Oshawa Generals
Sergey Tolchinsky, Right Wing, Sault Ste. Marie Greyhounds
Jakob Chychrun, Defence, Sarnia Sting
Jordan Subban, Defence, Belleville Bulls
Alex Nedeljkovic, Goaltender, Plymouth Whalers
D. J. Smith, Coach, Oshawa Generals

2015 OHL Priority Selection
On April 11, 2015, the OHL conducted the 2015 Ontario Hockey League Priority Selection. The Sudbury Wolves held the first overall pick in the draft, and selected David Levin from the Don Mills Flyers of the GTHL. Levin was awarded the Jack Ferguson Award, awarded to the top pick in the draft.

Below are the players who were selected in the first round of the 2015 Ontario Hockey League Priority Selection.

2015 NHL Entry Draft
On June 26-27, 2015, the National Hockey League conducted the 2015 NHL Entry Draft held at the BB&T Center in Sunrise, Florida. In total, 31 players from the Ontario Hockey League were selected in the draft. Connor McDavid of the Erie Otters was the first player from the OHL to be selected, as he was taken with the first overall pick by the Edmonton Oilers.

Below are the players selected from OHL teams at the NHL Entry Draft.

2015 CHL Import Draft
On June 30, 2015, the Canadian Hockey League conducted the 2015 CHL Import Draft, in which teams in all three CHL leagues participate in. The Sudbury Wolves held the first pick in the draft by a team in the OHL, and selected Dmitry Sokolov from Russia with their selection.

Below are the players who were selected in the first round by Ontario Hockey League teams in the 2015 CHL Import Draft.

References

Ontario Hockey League seasons
Ohl